Gildir (also Romanized as Gīldīr and Gildir; also known as Gīlder, Gelder, Gil’dyr, Goldar Badostan, and Qīlder) is a village in Bedevostan-e Gharbi Rural District, Khvajeh District, Heris County, East Azerbaijan Province, Iran. At the 2006 census, its population was 809, in 187 families.

References 

Populated places in Heris County